Ypsolopha elongata is a moth of the family Ypsolophidae. It is known from North America, including Utah.

References

Ypsolophidae
Moths of North America